Uwinymil, also spelt Uwinjmil and also known as Awinmul, is an extinct Australian Aboriginal language  of Arnhem Land in the Northern Territory of Australia.

Speakers of the language were recorded as inhabiting the area around Mt Bundey and Mount Goyder. The Uwinymil people's country is now in Kakadu National Park, and the people are part of a group to whom native title was granted in March 2022.

References

Gunwinyguan languages